The Vilnius Medical Society is the oldest medical society in Eastern Europe, established in 1805 on the initiative of Joseph Frank (son of Johann Peter Frank) and still continuing its activity. The same year, the society established a teaching hospital (clinic) under the Vilnius University Faculty of Medicine in Didžioji Street 1, which was the first institution of this type in Vilnius and present-day Lithuania. In a nearby building (Didžioji Street 10) the Vilnius University Therapy Clinic, Surgical Hospital, Vaccination and Maternity Institutes were established.

The society currently assists doctors to exchange scientific information, collaborates with other societies and scientists from other countries, researches the history of Lithuanian medicine, discusses current issues for doctors, organizes meetings to mark historical dates and honor the most outstanding members, publishes books and periodicals.

The history of the society, all members registrations, and their biographies were compiled to the Golden Book of the Vilnius Medical Society (decorated with the solid gold). The unique publication is now stored in the Vilnius University Library and is included in the Lithuanian National Register of UNESCO Memory of the World.

Gallery

References

External links

Medical and health organizations based in Lithuania
Organizations established in 1805
Professional associations based in Lithuania
1805 establishments in the Russian Empire
1805 establishments in Lithuania